The Blue Grotto refers to a number of sea caverns on the south east coast of Malta, a short distance from the fishing harbour limits of Wied iż-Żurrieq, Malta. Wied iz-Zurrieq, the blue grotto and neighboring caves, are all located within the Qrendi village confines, per Local Council Act 1993 and a 1910 legal dispute between the villages of Qrendi and Zurrieq over their jurisdiction, which ruled in favour of Qrendi. 

Both the Wied iz-Zurrieq harbour and Blue Grotto sea caves are located on the coastline opposite to the small uninhabited islet of Filfla,  which is a bird sanctuary. 

The location of the caves lead to the seawater reflecting shades of blue on the cave walls and ceilings. 

Several caverns also mirror the brilliant phosphorescent colours of the underwater flora and fauna, whilst other caverns show a deep dark shade of blue. 

Underwater, different colours of red, mauve, green, orange and yellow give an impressive picture to visitors.

The Blue Grotto is a popular destination for tourists to Malta with boat trips visiting the caves running all days of the year, weather permitting.

Scuba diving on the nearby scuttled wreck Um El Faroud, and snorkelling along the coastline, together with rock climbing, are the most popular activities practised here. 

The location has been used many times by filmmakers in big screen and TV productions, namely Hell Boats, Troy, twenty-fifth season of The Amazing Race, "Cadbury Milk Tray" chocolate adverts, and the Rai 2 travel programme Sereno Variabile, amongst other smaller commissions and photoshoots.

Gallery

References

Caves of Malta
Sea caves
Grottoes
Qrendi